Christina Black is an Irish politician and community worker. A member of Sinn Féin, Black is a member of Belfast City Council representing the Court constituency and has served as the 81st Lord Mayor of Belfast since 1 June 2022.

Biography 
Black received her Bachelor of Arts degree in politics from the Queen's University Belfast, followed by a Master of Science in community and social development from 2006 to 2009.

Black managed a community centre on the Grosvenor Road.

Political career 
In 2018, Black was co-opted onto Belfast City Council to fill a vacancy left by the resignation of Mary McConville. In May 2019, she was elected outright on the final count in the Court constituency.

Lord Mayor of Belfast 
Black was elected as the 81st Lord Mayor of Belfast in June 2022. Upon assuming the office of Lord Mayor, Black pledged to work "night and day for everyone in the city" and stated a desire to "lead an inclusive agenda of positive and progressive change".

On 1 July 2022, Black and presumptive First Minister Michelle O'Neill laid a wreath in commemoration of the Battle of the Somme, marking the first time two Irish nationalist politicians had jointly attended such an event.

References 

Living people
1970s births
Year of birth uncertain
Members of Belfast City Council

Lord Mayors of Belfast